Ryan Moon (born 15 September 1996) is a South African soccer player who plays as a forward who plays for Golden Arrows.

Moon has previously played for Maritzburg United and Kaizer Chiefs, and has represented South Africa internationally.

Moon was released by Kaizer Chiefs in 2019, when they declined an option on his contract. In June 2019 he trained with Scottish Premiership club Hibernian.

After spending the spring of 2022 as a free agent, Moon signed for Golden Arrows in June 2022.

Career statistics

Club

Notes

International

International goals
Scores and results list South Africa's goal tally first.

References

1996 births
Living people
South African soccer players
Association football forwards
South African Premier Division players
Maritzburg United F.C. players
Kaizer Chiefs F.C. players
Stellenbosch F.C. players
Sportspeople from Pietermaritzburg
South Africa international soccer players
Varbergs BoIS players
Allsvenskan players
South African expatriate soccer players
Expatriate footballers in Sweden
South African expatriate sportspeople in Sweden
Lamontville Golden Arrows F.C. players
Soccer players from KwaZulu-Natal